David Hurst (born Heinrich Theodor Hirsch; 8 May 1926 – 15 September 2019) was a German actor, best known for his role in the film Hello, Dolly as Rudolph the headwaiter.

Biography

Early life and career
Hurst grew up in a family of actors. As a Jewish child living in 1930s Germany, he faced persecution from the Nazi regime. After the pogroms of Kristallnacht, the British government allowed for the rescue of Jewish children from Germany, Austria, Czechoslovakia, Poland and the Free City of Danzig. He was one of the nearly 10,000 children in 1938–1939 moved with the Kindertransport to the United Kingdom. He was separated from his mother at 12 years old, and never saw her again.

Housed in a manor in Northern Ireland, he lived with other young emigrants in the care of the family of an estate manager. His first stage experience was in Belfast at a repertory theatre, where he also changed his name from Heinrich Hirsch to David Hurst. During the Second World War he joined the British army, but because of his German background he was assigned to Entertainments National Service Association, where he performed as an actor and a comedian.

His first film role was as Wolfgang Winkel in The Perfect Woman (1949), a role Hurst had previously played in the West End to critical praise. He went on to appear in many British films of the 1950s.

United States
In 1957, Hurst moved to the United States. He spent most of his time in California, but often performed on Broadway. In 1960, he created the role of Merlin in the original Broadway production of Camelot opposite Richard Burton.

Throughout the 1950s and 1960s he played in film, television and theatre. In 1959 he received the Clarence Derwent Award and in 1964, he was awarded the Obie Award from The Village Voice for his off-Broadway performance in A Month in the Country.

He performed in the film version of Hello, Dolly (1969) as Rudolph the headwaiter alongside Barbra Streisand and Walter Matthau. This was his most notable role in America. He also had roles in the films Kelly's Heroes (1970) and The Boys From Brazil (1978). Hurst also appeared in numerous TV series including Mission: Impossible, Serpico and Star Trek.

Throughout his career he worked as a visiting professor at Yale, Boston University and Carnegie Mellon.

Return to Germany
In the 1980s he appeared in several German-American co-productions, and visited his half-brother Wolfgang Heinz in East Berlin. Hurst decided to remain in Germany, and worked in Vienna and Berlin with a fellow erstwhile emigrant (and Actors Studio colleague), theatre director George Tabori. From 1991 Hurst worked at the Burgtheater, Vienna, eventually returning to live in Berlin in 2000, when he retired from acting. He died there on 15 September 2019 after suffering a stroke and pneumonia.

Appearances

Theatre

Films

Television

References

External links
 
 
 
 David Hurst at the University of Wisconsin's Actors Studio audio collection

1926 births
2019 deaths
Jewish emigrants from Nazi Germany to the United Kingdom
German male stage actors
German male film actors
German male television actors
Jewish British male actors
Jewish German male actors
20th-century German male actors
Kindertransport refugees
Male actors from Berlin
German emigrants to Northern Ireland
Northern Ireland emigrants to the United States
Male stage actors from Northern Ireland
Male film actors from Northern Ireland
Male television actors from Northern Ireland
British Army personnel of World War II